Kaistia soli is a Gram-negative, strictly aerobic and non-motile bacterium from the genus of Kaistia which has been isolated from a peat layer 1200 meter above sea level in Yongneup in Korea.

References

External links
Type strain of Kaistia soli at BacDive -  the Bacterial Diversity Metadatabase	

Hyphomicrobiales
Bacteria described in 2008